The 1962 Omloop Het Volk was the 17th edition of the Omloop Het Volk cycle race and was held on 10 March 1962. The race started and finished in Ghent. The race was won by Robert De Middeleir.

General classification

References

1962
Omloop Het Nieuwsblad
Omloop Het Nieuwsblad